Elena 'Nina' Iliescu (born 4 March 1930) is the wife of the 2nd President of Romania Ion Iliescu. She was the First Lady of Romania from 1989 to 1996 and once again from 2000 to 2004.

She was born Elena Șerbănescu, in the Crângași neighborhood of Bucharest. Her father died in 1945, while her mother had difficulties raising her and her sister. She met her future husband in 1948, when they were both 18-year-old students, she at the Iulia Hașdeu High School, and he at the Saint Sava High School, in Bucharest.

References

External links
http://www.hotnews.ro/stiri-esential-17092558-nina-iliescu-stare-buna-dupa-fost-operata-marti-colecist-spitalul-elias.htm
http://adevarul.ro/news/eveniment/sotia-fostului-presedinte-ion-iliescu-nina-iliescu-fost-externata-1_535f7d920d133766a8319240/index.html

1930 births
Living people
First Ladies of Romania
People from Bucharest